Horse Creek is an unincorporated community in Siskiyou County, California, United States.

The Brite Brothers
On August 29, 1936, ex-convicts John and Coke Brite shot and killed Siskiyou County Deputy Martin Lange, constable Joe Clark and visitor Fred Seaborn in a drunken haze near the isolated cabin where they lived with their parents. The brothers had earlier beaten up the elderly Seaborn and his friend, Horse Creek resident Charley Baker, after the latter, who hoped to chase them off from the rented cabin, having used it for free storage before.  Seaborn, a retired naval officer and the harbor master of the port of Vallejo, California was in Horse Creek to hunt deer with Baker. After the incident, the Brite brothers hid out in the Siskiyou Mountains for three weeks in fear of Siskiyou County's reputation for lynching murderers.  They secretly gave themselves up to Siskiyou County District Attorney James G. Davis, who along with Dr. Earl Harris drove them to Folsom Prison for their safety.  Davis, a native American, refused to prosecute, due to conflicting testimony of witness, believing they had been set up and were justified in self-defense for being set upon in the dead of night as they lie sleeping outdoors and clubbed by deputies, and was soon to be voted out of office. The Brite Brothers were convicted and sentenced to death, however appeals reduced the sentence to life in prison.  They were both paroled in 1951, after efforts of author Earle Stanley Gardner's 'Court of Last Resort', but were soon back in prison, where they died.

References

Unincorporated communities in California
Unincorporated communities in Siskiyou County, California